The Saikhan-Ovoo Coal Mine (beautiful mound) is an underground coal mine located near Saikhan-Ovoo in the Saikhan sum of Bulgan aimag in northern Mongolia, to the north of Saikhan-Ovoo Mountain.

The mine has coal reserves amounting to 190 million tonnes of coking coal.

References 

Coal mines in Mongolia